Nobody's Tune is the second studio album by Dutch jazz singer Wouter Hamel. The song See You Once Again was used in an advertisement for the BBC iPlayer.

Track listing 
 One More Time On The Merry Go-Around
 Big Blue Sea
 When Morning Comes
 In Between
 Nobody’S Tune
 Sir Henry
 March, April, May
 Quite The Disguise
 Once In A Lifetime
 Tiny Town
 See You Once Again
 Amsterdam

Bonus tracks 
  Slow And Blue
 Adore
 Late At Night
 A Distant Melody (Live @ Home)
 Nothing's Any Good(Live @ Home)
 Breezy (Live @ Home)

Charts

Weekly charts

Year-end charts

References 

2009 albums
Wouter Hamel albums